Miss America 2023 was the 95th edition of the Miss America pageant, which occurred at the Mohegan Sun on December 16, 2022. The 2023 calendar year, based on several sources, may be the final year at Mohegan Sun.

Rather than being aired on mainstream television, the pageant was streamed for the second consecutive year. Unlike the 2022 edition, which was streamed on the broadly-available Peacock from NBC, the 2023 edition was only available through the pageant streaming service Pageants Live, which features a subscription price of $32.99 per month with no lower-cost or event-only option available.

Miss America 2022, Emma Broyles of Alaska crowned Grace Stanke of Wisconsin, Miss America 2023 at the end of the event. Stanke became the third woman from Wisconsin won the title.

Background
Miss America 2023 was the 95th installment of the pageant, but the 101st Miss America anniversary. Contestants were required to be between ages 18 and 26 (born between January 1, 1996, and December 31, 2003), be a United States resident or citizen, and meet the particular residency requirements of the states, municipalities, and districts they represent. Candidates must also have been in proper, good or excellent health, including being fully vaccinated from COVID-19.

U.S. State contests occurred during spring and summer 2022.

Results

Placements 

§ – Voted into the Top 11 by receiving the America's Choice Award

Preliminary awards

Contestants
All 51 titleholders have been crowned.

Controversy and criticism 
In an effort to move away from its central focus as a beauty contest, the M.A. Organization removed the bathing suit competition and distanced itself from sexist roots of the past in 2018. Critics allege that the competition still objectifies participants and women generally, with one journalist arguing that "these females, beautiful or otherwise, need not continue being judged on and selected for their appearance (according to many women [and to some men], whether or not they monitor Miss America contests or may be Miss Americas themselves." Likewise, the clothes worn by some Miss Americas, particularly since 1983, are scrutinized for promoting objectification.

2023 marks the second year of the final competition night and crowning not being aired on mainstream television. The 2022 Miss America competition was streamed on NBC's Peacock and had several technical glitches throughout the show, causing many viewers to complain on social media about the production value. The 2023 competition was streamed on a pageant streaming service despite the Miss America organization announcing in 2018 that the competition is "no longer a pageant."

Notes

References
58. Miss America 2023 will be the 95th edition Miss America 2023 will be the 95th edition.

2023
2022 in the United States
2022 beauty pageants